The Socialist Party of Uruguay is a Uruguayan socialist political party.

History
The party was founded in 1910. Its main leader and spokesman was Dr Emilio Frugoni, a prominent advocate of socialist ideas in Uruguay. Its central organ was the newspaper Germinal, later superseded by El Sol.

The party was a member of the Labour and Socialist International between 1932 and 1940. In 1951 it joined the Socialist International, which it later left in 1960, and rejoined it in 1999. In 2017 the party once again withdrew from the Socialist International and joined the Progressive Alliance.

In 1971, the party was one of the founding members of the Broad Front, a left-wing coalition than won the 2004 election, 2009 election and 2014 election,  also electing one of its affiliates, Tabaré Vasquez, as president.

It is currently led by Gonzalo Civila.

The Broad Front supported Daniel Martinez, a member of Socialist Party of Uruguay, for the 2019 general election. Martinez arrived first at the first turn, but was defeated in the run-off by Luis Alberto Lacalle Pou of the National Party (also endorsed by Colorado Party and Open Cabildo). For the first time in 15 years, the Broad Front was defeated at the polls. The party also lost its majority and in the Chamber of Representatives and the Senate, while remaining the largest party in the General Assembly.

Electoral history

Presidential elections 
Due to its membership in the Broad Front, the party has endorsed the candidates of other parties on several occasions. Presidential elections in Uruguay are held using a two-round system, the results of which are displayed below.

References

External links

 Official webpage (in Spanish)

1910 establishments in Uruguay
Anti-imperialist organizations
Broad Front (Uruguay)
Democratic socialist parties in South America
Former member parties of the Socialist International
Members of the Labour and Socialist International
Political parties established in 1910
Political party factions in Uruguay
Progressive Alliance
Progressive parties
Social democratic parties in Uruguay
Socialism in Uruguay